Mesoscia latifera is a moth of the Megalopygidae family. It was described by Francis Walker in 1869.

References

Moths described in 1869
Megalopygidae